La Chaîne Disney is a Canadian French language specialty channel owned by Teletoon Canada, Inc., a subsidiary of Corus Entertainment, and launched on September 1, 2015, replacing Télétoon Rétro. It is a localized version of the U.S. subscription network Disney Channel, broadcasting live-action and animated programming aimed at children in French in Canada.

The launch of the network came alongside a licensing deal reached between Disney and Corus, who acquired Canadian rights to Disney Channel's programming library, and the announcement of a Canadian version of Disney Channel broadcasting in English that launched concurrently. Previous rightsholder DHX Media never operated any Disney Channel-branded services in English or French, and its only French-language Disney-branded property was a French-language Canadian version of the preschool children's brand Disney Junior.

History
French-language dubs of Disney Channel programs were historically aired by Radio-Canada and later Vrak.TV. The latter channel was co-owned with Family Channel. Vrak.TV was separated from Family with the acquisition of Astral Media by Bell Media; in an attempt to relieve concerns surrounding Bell's total market share in English-language television following the merger, Bell elected to divest Family Channel and its sister networks to DHX Media, which included Astral's French-language version of Disney Junior.

On April 16, 2015, Corus Entertainment announced that it had acquired long-term, Canadian multi-platform rights to Disney Channel's programming library; the cost and duration of the licensing deal were not disclosed. Alongside the licensing deal, Corus announced that it would officially launch a Canadian version of Disney Channel; the service will consist of linear television channels in English and French, along with TV Everywhere and video-on-demand services for digital platforms.

The French-language service, La chaîne Disney, launched concurrently with its English-language counterpart on September 1, 2015. It replaced Télétoon Rétro in its previous channel allotments, and operates under the same CRTC license.

In 2018, the channel was rebranded to match its English-language counterpart while keeping its logo.

Programming
La Chaîne Disney's programming mainly consists of French-language dubs of existing programs from Disney Channel. As no French versions of each brand exist, Disney XD and Disney Junior programs are also included, as part of their respective programming blocks, Disney Junior sur la chaîne Disney and, previously, XD Zone (shown on air as Disney XD Zone). Disney Channel shows also air on the blocks based on their respective themes. In order to fulfill CanCon requirements, the channel also airs content from other Corus-owned networks. Original series from the three channels are labelled in bold.

Current

Main programming
6teen
Amphibia
Camp Kikiwaka (Bunk'd)
Eddy Noisette (Scaredy Squirrel)
Frankie et les ZhuZhu Pets (The ZhuZhus)
Les Green à Big City (Big City Greens)
Hôtel Transylvanie (Hotel Transylvania)
Il pleut des hamburgers (Cloudy With a Chance of Meatballs)
Luz à Osville (The Owl House)
Molly McGee et le fantôme (The Ghost and Molly McGee)
Raven (Raven's Home)
La Retenue (Detentionaire)
Sourire d'enfer (Braceface)
Les Super Vilains de Valley View (The Villains of Valley View)
Ultra Violet et Black Scorpion (Ultra Violet and Black Scorpion)
Va t’en, licorne! (Go Away, Unicorn!)
Wayside, l'école sens dessus dessous (Wayside)
Les Zybrides (Spliced)

Disney Junior programming
Alice et la pâtissserie des merveilles (Alice's Wonderland Bakery)
Bluey
Eureka
La Famille Berenstain (The Berenstain Bears)
Firebuds, Premiers Secours (Firebuds)
La Force des Royaumes (Kingdom Force)
Gigantosaurus
Marguerite et la bête féroce (Maggie and the Ferocious Beast)
La maison magique de Mickey (Mickey Mouse Funhouse)
Mega Souhait (Super Wish)
Les Mini Sorcières (Little Charmers)
Les Mini-Tuques (Snowsnaps)
Le monde de Bingo et Rolly (Puppy Dog Pals)
Peppa (Peppa Pig)
Pikwik Pack
Les Pyjamasques (PJ Masks)
Spidey et ses amis extraordinaires (Spidey and His Amazing Friends)

Along with the programs above, the channel airs movies as part of the programming block, Disneyrama (formerly Cinéma la chaîne Disney).

Upcoming
Hamster et Gretel (Hamster and Gretel)

Former

Main programming
Les 7N (The 7D)
Agent K.C. (K.C. Undercover)
Andi (Andi Mack)
Austin et Ally (Austin and Ally)
Avengers Rassemblement
Les aventures de Mickey et ses amis (Mickey Mouse's Mixed-Up Adventures)
La bande à Picsou (DuckTales)
Baymax et les Nouveaux Héros (Big Hero 6)
Best Friends Whenever
Les Bio Teens (Lab Rats)
Les Bio Teens : Forces spéciales (Lab Rats: Elite Force)
Blagues Squad (Walk the Prank)
Boucle d'Or et Petit Ours (Goldie and Bear)
C'est pas moi ! (I Didn't Do It)
Colis de la Planète X (Packages From Planet X)
Coop et Cami (Coop and Cami Ask the World)
Cornich' et 'Cahuète (Pickle and Peanut)
Docteur Lapeluche (Doc McStuffins)
Doggyblog (Dog With a Blog)
Elena d'Avalor (Elena of Avalor)
Frankie et Paige (Bizaardvark)
Gabby Duran, baby-sitter d'extraterrestres (Gabby Duran and the Unsittables)
La Garde du Roi lion (The Lion Guard)
Les Gardiens de la Galaxie (Guardians of the Galaxy)
Harley, le cadet de mes soucis (Stuck in the Middle)
Henry Câlimonstre (Henry Hugglemonster)
Jake et les pirates du Pays imaginaire (Jake and the Never Land Pirates)
Jessie
Kirby Buckets
Lego Star Wars : Les aventures de Freemaker (Lego Star Wars: The Freemaker Adventures)
Liv et Maddie (Liv and Maddie)
La maison de Mickey (Mickey Mouse Clubhouse)
MECH-X4
Mighty Med, super urgences (Mighty Med)
Miles dans l'espace (Miles From Tomorrowland)
Le monde de Riley (Girl Meets World)
Les Muppet Babies (Muppet Babies)
Penn Zero : Héros à Mi-Temps (Penn Zero: Part Time Hero)
Phinèas et Ferb (Phineas and Ferb)
Princesse Sofia (Sofia the First)
Raiponce (Rapunzel's Tangled Adventure)
Robover (Future-Worm!)
Shériff Callie au Far West (Sheriff Callie's Wild West)
Les souvenirs de Gravity Falls (Gravity Falls)
Star Butterfly (Star vs the Forces of Evil)
Star Wars Rebels
Star Wars Resistance
Wander (Wander Over Yonder)
Vampirina

Acquired programming
Babar
Benjamin (Franklin)
Drôles de colocs (Endangered Species)
Jane et le dragon (Jane and the Dragon) 
Joue avec Jess (Guess with Jess)
Juste pour rire : Les gags Full Ado (Just Kidding)
L'heure de la terreur (The Haunting Hour)
Ma gardienne est un vampire (My Babysitter's a Vampire)
Miss Spider et ses amis (Miss Spider's Sunny Patch Friends)
Ricky Zoom
Rolie Polie Olie
Spider-Man (1967)
Spiez! Nouvelle génération (The Amazing Spiez!)
Splatalot
Stoked
Les Trois Amigonautes (The Three Amigonauts)
Trois et moi (My Life Me)

References

External links

Disney Channel
Corus Entertainment networks
Television channels and stations established in 2015
French-language television networks in Canada
Children's television networks in Canada
2015 establishments in Canada